ToPaRaMa is a collaborative album by American drummers Pat Mastelotto (member of King Crimson) and Tobias Ralph (member of Adrian Belew's band). It features many other musicians, such as bassist Tony Levin, keyboardist Roy Powell and guitarist Markus Reuter.

Track listing
"Willie's in the Backyard"
"NY5"
"Mama Will Bark"
"Little People"
"Sing Sang Sung"
"Floor Over Heaven"
"Up Heavy"
"New O"
"Moo Baba"
"BaBaBoom"
"Rendezvous with Rama pt1"
"OM"
"Bad Ass Van, Man"

Personnel
Pat Mastelotto – drums, percussion, sound design
Tobias Ralph – drums, cowbell, Rhodes
Markus Reuter – U8 Touch guitar
Roy Powell – Rhodes and Moog samples
Lorenzo Feliciati– bass, keys, strings
Tony Levin – upright bass
David Rothenberg – clarinet
Angelica Sanchez – piano
Bernhard Wöstheinrich – soundscapes
Bill Munson – vocals, samples
Leashya Padma Munson – vocals, samples
Robert Fisher – spoken words

References

2014 albums